The Patriot is a 1986 action film directed by Frank Harris and starring Gregg Henry, Simone Griffeth and Stack Pierce with Leslie Nielsen.

Plot summary
A gang led by a man called Atkins (played by Stack Pierce) steal nuclear weapons from a storage facility in the desert. A burnt out former Navy SEAL and Vietnam vet who was previously dishonorably discharged is contacted by his former commanding officer to help retrieve the weapons.

Cast
Gregg Henry as Lieutenant Matt Ryder
Simone Griffeth as Sean
Michael J. Pollard as Howard
Jeff Conaway as Commander Michael Mitchell
Stack Pierce as Atkins
Leslie Nielsen as Admiral Frazer
Glenn Withrow as Pink
Larry Mintz as Bite
Diane Stevenett as Maggie
Anthony Caldarella as Eight Ball
Mike Gomez as Kenwood
Larry Moss as Devon
Smith Osbourne as Rosa
Sally Brown as Girl in Bar

Release
The Patriot was released in the United States on July 25, 1986, and in the Philippines on December 4, 1987.

References

External links

1986 films
1986 action films
American action films
American independent films
Crown International Pictures films
Films directed by Frank Harris
Films shot in California
1980s English-language films
1980s American films